Parabrahm is the second studio album  by Australian singer-songwriter Brian Cadd. It followed the success of his debut self-titled album. It was released in Australia in October 1973 by Bootleg Records and in the United States on Chelsea Records.

Parabrahm peaked at number 5 in the Australian album charts on 10 November 1973.

At the 1973 Australian Radio Records Awards, the album won Best Male Vocal Album.

Track listing
All tracks written by Brian Cadd .
 "Heroes" – 4:18
 "Handyman" – (B. Cadd)  5:04
 "Give Me a Present" – 2:41
 "Matilda" – 4:36
 "Keep on Rockin'" – 4:39
 "Sweet Little Country Lady" – 4:13
 "Too Young" – 2:50
 "Kingston River Travellin' Man" – 3:10
 "Riverboat Lady" – 3:35
 "Little Old Country Lady" – 2:38

Charts

References

Brian Cadd albums
1973 albums